A Ferris wheel is a popular type of amusement ride invented by George Washington Gale Ferris Jr.

Ferris wheel may also refer to:
 Ferris Wheel (1893), the original 1893 Chicago Wheel, built by George Washington Gale Ferris Jr.
 Ferris Wheel (album), released in 1970 by British band The Ferris Wheel
 The Ferris Wheel (album), released in 1993 by American band Mad at the World
 The Ferris Wheel (band), a British group formed in 1966
 The Ferris Wheel (film), a 1993 Swedish drama
 "Ferris Wheel", a song by the Scottish singer-songwriter Donovan on the album Sunshine Superman (1966)
 "Ferris Wheel", a song by pop-rock band Imagine Dragons on the album Mercury – Acts 1 & 2 (2022)
 "Ferris Wheel", a song by the Canadian rapper Tory Lanez on the album Love Me Now? (2018)
 "Ferris Wheel", a 2021 track by Toby Fox from Deltarune Chapter 2 OST from the video game Deltarune

See also
 Ferris (disambiguation)
 Ferris Wheel on Fire, a 2011 EP by American band Neutral Milk Hotel
 List of Ferris wheels